Pinit Boonjoung (born 25 November 1954) is a Thai boxer. He competed in the men's featherweight event at the 1976 Summer Olympics. At the 1976 Summer Olympics, he lost in his first fight to Choon Gil-Choi of South Korea.

References

1954 births
Living people
Pinit Boonjoung
Pinit Boonjoung
Boxers at the 1976 Summer Olympics
Place of birth missing (living people)
Featherweight boxers